The Navy 44 (M&R) is an American sailboat that was designed by McCurdy & Rhodes for the US Navy for sail training at the United States Naval Academy and built in 1985.

The design was originally built by the manufacturer as the Navy 44, but is now usually referred to as the Navy 44 (M&R) or Mark I to differentiate it from the unrelated 1963 Alfred E. Luders designed Annapolis 44 which it replaced and the David Perick Navy 44 Mark II design which superseded it.

Production
The design was built by Tillotson Pearson in the United States, with 20 boats built, all of them in 1985.

Design
The Navy 44 is a training keelboat, built predominantly of fiberglass, with wood trim. It has a rig, a raked stem, a reverse transom, a skeg-mounted rudder controlled by a wheel and a fixed fin keel. It displaces .

It is fitted with a Westerbeke diesel engine for docking and maneuvering.

The design has sleeping accommodation for seven people, with two single berths in the bow cabin, two straight settee berths and two pilot berths in the main cabin and an aft cabin with a single berth on the starboard side. The galley is located on the starboard side just forward of the companionway ladder. The galley is "L"-shaped and is equipped with a three-burner stove, an ice box and a double sink. A navigation station is opposite the galley, on the port side. The head is located on the port side of the companionway.

See also
List of sailing boat types

References

External links

Keelboats
1980s sailboat type designs
Sailing yachts 
Sailboat type designs by McCurdy & Rhodes
Sailboat types built by Pearson Yachts
United States Naval Academy